Tasneem Tafsir (also known as Tafsir Tasnim) is an exegesis of the Quran by contemporary Shia scholar Abdollah Javadi Amoli. 

The work is written in Persian. The exegesis follows Tabatabaei's al-Mizan, in that it tries to interpret a verse based on other verses. The author's methodology for interpretation of each verse is to start with the summary of the exegesis, detailed exegesis, points and morals, and finally ends it with narrational (Hadith) discussion of the verse.

Awards
The book won the 2006 Islamic Educational scientific and cultural organization Award as the "top research in the field of Islamic and Quranic Studies" category.

References

External links
 Tasnim
 Tasnim
 Esra International Foundation for Revealed Knowledges
 The Iranian Book News Agency

Shia tafsir